The Ming dynasty was a dynasty of China that existed from 1368 to 1644, succeeding the Mongol-led Yuan dynasty and falling amidst much political turmoil to the short-lived Shun dynasty. Sixteen emperors ruled over the whole of China proper spanning 276 years. Following the collapse of the Ming dynasty in 1644, members of the Ming imperial family continued to rule parts of southern China until 1662; this regime is known as the Southern Ming in historiography.

Emperors

Southern Ming

Other Ming claimants included Zhu Benli, Prince of Han (1646–1663) and Zhu Changqing, Prince of Huai (1648–1661). If Zhu Benli existed, he would be the last legal emperor of Southern Ming from the execution (1662) of Zhu Youlang. However, Zhu Benli's identity and existence are disputed, and Zhu Youlang is generally taken to be the last emperor of Southern Ming. Ming prince Zhu Shugui carried out his duties in the Kingdom of Tungning in the name of the last Southern Ming emperor until 1683.

Individuals posthumously recognized as emperors
This is a list of individuals who did not reign as emperor during their lifetime but were later recognized as Ming emperors posthumously.

Timeline 

Legend:
  denotes Ming emperors
  denotes Southern Ming emperors

See also 
 List of vassals prince peerages of Ming dynasty
 Dynasties in Chinese history
 List of Chinese monarchs

Notes

References 

.
.
Ming
Lists of leaders of China
Lists of Chinese people

it:Dinastia Ming#Lista degli imperatori